Ewa Lipska (born 8 October 1945 in Kraków), is a Polish poet from the generation of the Polish "New Wave." Collections of her verse have been translated into English, Italian, Czech, Danish, Dutch, German and Hungarian. She lives in Vienna and Kraków.

The Adam Mickiewicz Institute comments: "While her verse may have some connections with politics, it always documents concrete personal experiences without reaching for grand generalizations. As it unmasks the language of propaganda, her poetry also indicates the weaknesses of language in general as an instrument of human perception and communication."

Books

Poetry collections
 1967: Wiersze, ("Poems"); Warsaw: Czytelnik
 1970: Drugi wybor wierszy, ("Second Collection of Poems"); Warsaw: Czytelnik
 1972: Trzeci wybor wierszy, ("Third Collection of Poems"); Warsaw: Czytelnik
 1974: Czwarty wybor wierszy, ("Fourth Collection of Verse"); Warsaw: Czytelnik
 1978: Piaty wybor wierszy, ("Fifth Collection of Verse"); Warsaw: Czytelnik
 1979: Dom spokojnej młodości ("A Home for Youth"), selected poems, Kraków: Wydawnictwo literackie
 1979: Zywa smierc, ("Living Death"); Kraków: Wydawnictwo literackie
 1981: Poezje wybrane ("Selected Poems"), Warszawa: LSW
 1982: Nie o śmierć tutaj chodzi, lecz o biały kordonek ("Death Is Not at Stake, But the White Cord"), selected poems, Kraków: Wydawnictwo literackie
 1985: Przechowalnia ciemnosci, ("Storage for Darkness"); Warsaw: Przedswit / Warszawska Oficyna Poetow i Malarzy
 1986: Utwory wybrane ("Selected Work"), Kraków: Wydawnictwo literackie
 1990: Strefa ograniczonego postoju, ("Limited Standing Zone"); Warsaw: Czytelnik
 1993: Wakacje mizantropa. Utwory wybrane ("Misanthrope Holidays: Selected Work"), Kraków: Wydawnictwo literackie
 1994: Stypendisci czasu, ("Time's Scholarship Winners"); Wroclaw: Wydawnictwo Dolnoslaskie
 1996: Wspólnicy zielonego wiatraczka. Lekcja literatury z Krzysztofem Lisowskim ("Partners of the Green Fan: Literature Lesson with Krzysztof Lisowski"), selected poems, Kraków: Wydawnictwo literackie
 1997: Ludzie dla poczatkujacych, ("People for Beginners"); Poznan: a5
 1998: Godziny poza godzinami ("Hours Beyond Hours"), selected poems, Warsaw: PIW
 1998: Życie zastępcze, Kraków: Wydawnictwo literackie
 1999: 1999, Kraków: Wydawnictwo literackie
 2001: Sklepy zoologiczne, ("Pet Shops"); Kraków: Wydawnictwo literackie
 2002: Uwaga: stopień, Kraków: Wydawnictwo literackie
 2003: Ja ("I"); Kraków: Wydawnictwo literackie
 2004: Gdzie indziej, ("Somewhere else"); Kraków: Wydawnictwo literackie
 2006: Drzazga, Kraków: Wydawnictwo literackie
 2007: Pomarańcza Newtona, ("Newton's Orange"); Kraków: Wydawnictwo literackie

Prose
 2009: Sefer (prose), Kraków: Wydawnictwo Literackie

Other
2018: Boli tylko, gdy się śmieję... Listy i rozmowy, Stanisław Lem,   Ewa Lipska,   Tomasz Lem,  ebook, 2018, Wydawnictwo Literackie
From book description: "... Contains records of conversations the poet and the writer had in early 21st century , as well as the letters which  Ewa Lipska exchanged with Stanisław Lem's son when he sudied in the United States. The book is adorned with numerous photos."

Selected translations of poetry by Ewa Lipska

(English) Poet? Criminal? Madman? (Poems). London-Boston: Forest Books, 1991.
(French) Poemes. Deux poétesses Polonaises contemporaines: Ewa Lipska et Wislawa Szymborska. Mundolsheim: L'Ancrier, 1996.
(German) Auf den dächern der mausoleen. Gedichte. Berlin: Oberbaum, 1983.
(German) Meine zeit. Mein lieb. Mein. leben. Geditchte. Salzburg, Wien: Residenz, 1990.
(Danish) En misantrops ferie. Aarhus: Husets, 1990.
(English) The New Century. Evanston: Northwestern University Press, 2009
(Spanish) La astilla. La naranja de Newton Ediciones TREA, 2010. 
(Dutch) Beste mevrouw Schubert, Gent, Poëziecentrum, 2015. 
(Italian) Il lettore di impronte digitali, Rome: Donzelli, 2017.

References

External links 

 Essay on Ewa Lipska at www.culture.pl
 Polish bibliography

20th-century Polish poets
21st-century Polish poets
1945 births
Living people
Recipients of the Silver Medal for Merit to Culture – Gloria Artis
Recipients of the Gold Cross of Merit (Poland)
Polish women poets
International Writing Program alumni
21st-century Polish women writers
20th-century Polish women writers